Magnat is a surname. Notable people with the surname include:

Julien Magnat, film and television screenwriter and director
Joseph Magnat, a founder of Magnat-Debon (1893-1962), a manufacturer of French motorcycles and scooters (:fr:Magnat-Debon)
Natalia Magnat (1954-1997), Soviet dissident

Surnames of French origin